Kary Arora (born 7 January 1977) is an Indian DJ. She is best known as India's first female DJ. Arora began DJing in 1997 and became the 5th female music composer in Bollywood. She ventured into music composition, writing lyrics, rapping, grunge singing.

Early life and education
Kary Arora was born in Chandigarh, India on 7 January 1977. There were no profound DJing schools back in India in 1997, so she joined Adersh sound and light company in Delhi as a sound labor/DJ for 300 rupees to understand digital connections of console. She taught herself DJing in a year, while shifting jobs in Delhi. Her training for music and keyboards happened under Guru Ravi Prakash, provides her with a greater understanding of music. She studied Audio Engineering at SAE Institute in Chennai to improve her skills of songwriting.

Musical career

As a DJ
She began Djing in 1997 as a freelance. Her first resident DJing was in club Temptation in Delhi from 1999 to 2000, then joined Buzz-Delhi from 2001 to 2004, Flames in Le Meridian-Chennai in 2005, Buzz-Gurgaon, Delhi-NCR from 2006 to 2008 and until present she has been freelancing performing in clubs across the globe.

As a songwriter
From Jingles to Bollywood Songs, she has made a mark in all parts of Indian music industry. She has successfully juggled between roles; be it a Singer, composer, music director or an Audio Engineer. Kary is one of those rare breed of music directors who would walk a mile to record best suited tunes and come up with absolute wicked songs required to meet the demands of the script. In 2008 she composed her first single Funny Happy B'day to U for Meow Fm, in 2009 composed a background score 48 Sec of Morning Melody for CNEB channel. Spectral Records released her two singles Sanware ki Dhun and De De Deedaar De in 2013. In 2013, she made her debut as music composer in Bollywood movie Satya 2 with her song Satya is Back Again In 2015, she composed song Tinko ke Sahare in movie Angry Indian Goddesses.

Awards and nominations
Limca Book of Records honored Arora as India's first woman DJ in 2014. In her residency, Buzz has been awarded of Best Bar with dancing in 2007 and Best Bar of the town in 2008 by Times Nightlife of India. Arora was featured in the documentary 360 Degree DJs, and was ranked as one of Delhi's top five DJs for two years.

Discography

Soundtracks

Remixes

Singles

Background scores

References

External links
 
 Interview with foodandnightlife.com
 
Asianage - Pick Your Favorite
Echo of India - Port Blair Country's 1st Female DJ
My Swar Artist Profile
Lim Ca Book of Records India

Musicians from Chandigarh
1977 births
Living people
Indian DJs
Women DJs
21st-century women musicians